WLIN-FM (101.1 FM) is a radio station licensed to serve the community of Durant, Mississippi. The station is owned by Boswell Media, LLC, and airs an adult contemporary format.

The station was assigned the call sign WKOZ-FM by the Federal Communications Commission on January 9, 1997. The station changed its call sign to WLIN-FM on March 3, 1997.

References

External links
Official Website
FCC Public Inspection File for WLIN-FM

LIN-FM
Radio stations established in 1998
1998 establishments in Mississippi
Mainstream adult contemporary radio stations in the United States
Holmes County, Mississippi